A phantom island is a purported island which was included on maps for a period of time, but was later found not to exist. They usually originate from the reports of early sailors exploring new regions, and are commonly the result of navigational errors, mistaken observations, unverified misinformation, or deliberate fabrication. Some have remained on maps for centuries before being "un-discovered."

Unlike lost lands, which are claimed (or known) to have once existed but to have been swallowed by the sea or otherwise destroyed, a phantom island is one that is claimed to exist contemporaneously, but later found not to have existed in the first place (or found not to be an island, as with the Island of California).

Examples
Some may have been purely mythical, such as the Isle of Demons near Newfoundland, which may have been based on local legends of a haunted island. The far-northern island of Thule was reported to exist by 4th-century BCE Greek explorer Pytheas, but information about its purported location was lost; explorers and geographers since have speculated that it was the Shetland Islands, Iceland, Scandinavia, or possibly nonexistent. The island of Hy-Brasil was sometimes depicted on maps west of Ireland, but all accounts of it have been fanciful.

Some phantom islands arose through the faulty positioning of actual islands, or other geographical errors. Pepys Island was a misidentification of the Falkland Islands. The Baja California Peninsula and the Banks Peninsula in New Zealand each appear as islands on some early maps, but were later discovered to be attached to their mainlands. Isle Phelipeaux, an apparent duplication of Isle Royale in Lake Superior, appeared on explorers' maps for many years, and even served as a landmark for the border between the United States and the territory that would become Canada, before subsequent exploration by surveyors determined that it did not exist. 

Sandy Island appeared on maps of the Coral Sea beginning in the late 19th century, between the Chesterfield Islands and Nereus Reef near New Caledonia, but was "undiscovered" in the 1970s. Nonetheless, it continued to be included in mapping data sets into the early 21st century, until its non-existence was re-confirmed in 2012.

Other phantom islands are misidentifications of breakers, icebergs, fog banks, pumice rafts from underwater volcanoes, or optical illusions. Observed in the Weddell Sea in 1823 but never again seen, New South Greenland may have been the result of a superior mirage. Some such as Thompson Island or Bermeja may have been actual islands subsequently destroyed by volcanic explosions, earthquakes, submarine landslides, or low-lying lands such as sand banks that are no longer above water. Pactolus Bank, visited by Sir Francis Drake in 1578, may fit into this former sand bank category.

In some cases, cartographers intentionally include invented geographic features in their maps, either for fraudulent purposes or to identify plagiarists.

List of phantom islands

See also

 Former island
 Fictitious entry
 List of fictional islands
 List of lost lands
 Null Island
 Lost city
 Mythical place
 Phantom settlement
 Terra incognita
Vigia

References

Further reading

 
 
 
 Gaddis, Vincent, Invisible Horizons, Chilton Books. New York. 1965.
 Clark Barnaby Firestone, The Coasts of Illusion: A Study of Travel Tales, Harper Books, 1924.
 Johnson, Donald S., Phantom Islands of the Atlantic, New York, Walker Publishing, 1996 (Rev. ed.).
 William Shepard Walsh, A Handy Book of Curious Information, J. B. Lippincott, 1913.
 Dirk Liesemer, Lexikon der Phantominseln. Hamburg, mareverlag, 2016, .
 
 
 L. Ivanov and N. Ivanova. Phantom islands. In: The World of Antarctica. Generis Publishing, 2022. pp. 74–77.